Phytanoyl-CoA is a coenzyme A derivative of phytanic acid.

The enzyme phytanoyl-CoA hydroxylase catalyses hydroxylation of phytanoyl-CoA.

References

Thioesters of coenzyme A